Jules Jurgensen was a watchmaking company.

History
The company was founded by Jürgen Jürgensen in 1740 in Denmark, when Jürgen Jürgensen went into partnership with Isaac Larpent, under the name "Larpent & Jürgensen".

Upon Jürgen's death in 1811, his son Urban took over the company, keeping the name. It was changed in 1814.

Jules Jürgensen produced most of its watches in Switzerland. Jules Jürgensen was sold to a U.S.-based company in 1936, but watches were still produced in Switzerland until 1957, when the documentation shows the watches were made by other manufacturers and branded with the Jürgensen name. 

In 1974, Mort Clayman, a watch distributor in the U.S. purchased the company. According to the company's website, it [Rhapsody] has ceased operation, but is still honoring warranties. Mort Clayman died in January 2010, and his survivors closed the company. In 2011, Dr. Helmut Crott, owner of Urban Jürgensen & Sønner acquired the rights from the Clayman family.

In 2021 Finnish watchmaker Kari Voutilainen together with a group of investors acquired the Urban Jürgensen company and was appointed as its CEO.

References 

Watch brands
Companies established in 1740